Hyllisia ochreovittata is a species of beetle in the family Cerambycidae. It was described by Breuning in 1940.

References

ochreovittata
Beetles described in 1940
Taxa named by Stephan von Breuning (entomologist)